Pollentia (Catalan: Pol·lèntia) was a Roman city founded by Quintus Caecilius Metellus Balearicus in the present city of Alcúdia, allegedly in the year 123 BC. The first documented remains belong, however, to the first half of the 1st century BC. This had led the researches to establish the possibility of the creation of a castra (military camp) by the military expedition that, a generation later, would result in the current city of Pollentia.

History 

Like the other Roman cities founded by consul Metellus, it is believed Pollentia was a Roman castra (camp) until c. 70 BC, when, according to the excavations in the forum area, the urbanization of the city was reorganized and monumentalized. Pollentia was a rich and prosperous city, whose conserved area is around 16 hectares. This area suffered a devastating fire in the 3rd century AD, but the city was not depopulated, since the construction of a fortification in the 5th century AD has been documented in the same forum. In the following centuries, Pollentia was partially or totally unpopulated, with the Christian medieval population settling down a bit further north, in the present town of Alcúdia. Excavations, since the 16th century, but especially since the beginning of the 20th century, have occurred mainly in the area of Sa Portella (a residential district), the city forum and the tabernae, and in the theater.

References

History of Mallorca
Roman towns and cities in Spain
17th-century archaeological discoveries
Archaeological museums in Spain
Former populated places in Spain
Ruins in Spain